This is an alphabetical list of loughs (lakes) on the island of Ireland. It also shows a table of the largest loughs. The word lough is pronounced like loch and comes from the Irish loch, meaning lake.

According to the Environmental Protection Agency, there are an estimated 12,000 lakes in the Republic of Ireland, covering an area of more than 1,200 square kilometres. The largest lough, by area, in Ireland is Lough Neagh. Lough Corrib is the second largest, and is the largest in the Republic. The largest lough, by water volume, is Lough Neagh, with Lough Mask being the largest in the Republic.

The list below contains only those loughs that are of geographic, geological, or historical importance and almost all of them are over a square kilometre in area. It includes loughs that are in Northern Ireland and the Republic of Ireland. Those partly or wholly within Northern Ireland are marked with an asterisk (*).

Largest Irish lakes

The largest freshwater loughs in Ireland are:

Muckross Lake (the middle lake of the Killarney lakes) is the deepest Irish lake, with a maximum depth of 75 metres.

(Volume = Area * Mean Depth)

Freshwater lakes 

Lakes with the county/counties where they are situated and their area in square kilometres. Most of the Republic of Ireland lake areas are taken from the Environmental Protection Agency's A Reference based Typology and Ecological Assessment System for Irish Lakes (pp. 10–13)

Brackish loughs 
An example of a brackish lagoon is Lady's Island Lake, County Wexford

Turloughs 

 Loughareema, County Antrim*
 Glenamaddy Turlough, County Galway
 Rahasane Turlough, County Galway
 Shannon Pot, County Cavan

Reservoirs 
 Poulaphouca Reservoir, County Wicklow
 Silent Valley Reservoir, County Down*
 Spelga Reservoir, County Down*
 Vartry Reservoir, County Wicklow

Sea loughs 
 Belfast Lough, between County Antrim and County Down*
 Strangford Lough, County Down*
 Lough Foyle, between County Donegal and County Londonderry*
 Galway Bay, County Galway
 Lough Hyne, County Cork
 Larne Lough, County Antrim*
 Lough Mahon, County Cork
 Shannon Estuary, Munster
 Tralee Bay, County Kerry
 Waterford Harbour, County Waterford
 Wexford Harbour, County Wexford

Fjords 
 Carlingford Lough, between County Louth and County Down*
 Lough Swilly, County Donegal
 Killary Harbour, between County Mayo & County Galway

See also 

Rivers of Ireland
List of rivers in Ireland
List of loughs of County Mayo
Lake-burst

References 

List
Ireland
Northern Ireland geography-related lists
Northern Ireland
Loughs